Sakalua is an islet of Nukufetau, Tuvalu. In the 19th century whalers established a shore camp on Sakalua where coal was used to melt down the whale blubber. The islet has been known as 'Coal Island'.

The island has a large colony of terns.

References

Islands of Tuvalu
Pacific islands claimed under the Guano Islands Act
Nukufetau